Colostygia pectinataria, the green carpet, is a moth of the genus Colostygia in the family Geometridae. It was first described by August Wilhelm Knoch in 1781.

The strong forewing ground colour is green to bluish green. The wing pattern shows the following colour sequence: a small region at the wing base brown green, the ensuing basal region brighter green, a wide and strongly serrated on the outside discal region dark green edged with white, the postdiscal region whitish green and the marginal region tinted brownish green. There are two distinct blackish spots near the front edge of the wing (costa) and one on the inner edge. In older specimens, the greenish colour can fade. Sometimes newly emerged hatched moths have a whitish, yellowish or pink colour. The hindwings shimmer grey white and have faint lines. The antennae of the males are combed, those of females are simple. The larva is stout, gnarled and light grey violet in colour. It has numerous small black spots that each carry a short, stiff brush.

It occurs in many different biotopes, on moors, in marshy terrain and also in forests. The larvae feed primarily on Galium but also on Rumex  and Lamium. The moths fly at night in June – July and often come to light.

It is a Palearctic species found in the Iberian Peninsula over western and central Europe including the British Isles and east to the Altai Mountains. C. pectinataria reaches the Arctic Circle in Fennoscandia, to the south the occurrence ranges from the western Mediterranean to the Balkan Peninsula, the Black Sea region and the Caucasus.

Bogs, forests, bushy forest edges and damp heath areas are preferred.

References

External links

Green carpet at UKMoths
Lepidoptera of Belgium
Lepiforum e.V.
De Vlinderstichting 

Cidariini
Moths described in 1781
Moths of Europe
Moths of Asia
Taxa named by August Wilhelm Knoch